The first stage of the 2014 Copa Libertadores de América was played from January 28 to February 6, 2014. A total of 12 teams competed in the first stage.

Draw
The draw of the tournament was held on December 12, 2013, 21:00 UTC−3, at the CONMEBOL Convention Centre in Luque, Paraguay.

For the first stage, the 12 teams were drawn into six ties containing a team from Pot 1 and a team from Pot 2, with the former hosting the second leg. The seeding of each team was determined by which associations reached the furthest stage in the previous Copa Libertadores.

Seeding
The following were the seeding of the 12 teams entered into the first stage draw:

Format
In the first stage, each tie was played on a home-and-away two-legged basis. If tied on aggregate, the away goals rule was used. If still tied, the penalty shoot-out was used to determine the winner (no extra time was played). The winners of each tie advanced to the second stage to join the 26 automatic qualifiers.

Matches
The first legs were played on January 28–30, and the second legs were played on February 4–6, 2014.

|}

Match G1

Tied 3–3 on aggregate, Atlético Paranaense won on penalties.

Match G2

Botafogo won 4–1 on aggregate.

Match G3

Universidad de Chile won 4–2 on aggregate.

Match G4

Lanús won 3–0 on aggregate.

Match G5

Tied 2–2 on aggregate, Santa Fe won on away goals.

Match G6

Nacional won 2–1 on aggregate.

References

External links
 
Copa Libertadores 2014, CONMEBOL.com 

1